Poland competed at the 2022 World Aquatics Championships in Budapest, Hungary from 17 June to 3 July.

Medalists

Diving

Poland entered four divers.

Men

Women

Open water swimming

Poland qualified one male open water swimmer.

Men

Swimming

Poland entered 12 swimmers.

Men

Women

References

World Aquatics Championships
Nations at the 2022 World Aquatics Championships
2022